Dennis Morgan (born Earl Stanley Morner, December 20, 1908 – September 7, 1994) was an American actor-singer. He used the acting pseudonym Richard Stanley before adopting the name under which he gained his greatest fame.

According to one obituary, he was "a twinkly-eyed handsome charmer with a shy smile and a pleasant tenor voice in carefree and inconsequential Warner Bros musicals of the forties, accompanied by Jack Carson." Another said, "for all his undoubted star potential, Morgan was perhaps cast once too often as the likeable, clean-cut, easy-going but essentially uncharismatic young man who typically loses his girl to someone more sexually magnetic." David Shipman said he "was comfortable, good-looking, well-mannered: the antithesis of the gritty Bogart."

Life and career

Early life
Morgan was born in the village of Prentice in Price County, in northern Wisconsin, the son of Grace J. (née Vandusen) and Frank Edward Morner. He was of Swedish descent on his father's side.

He enrolled at Carroll College in Waukesha, Wisconsin as a member of the 1930 graduating class. He was awarded the Carroll College Distinguished Alumnus Award in 1983.

Early career
He began his career as a radio announcer in Milwaukee and went on to broadcast Green Bay Packers football games. He became a radio singer in Chicago.

Stanley Morner at MGM
After relocating to Los Angeles, Morgan began appearing in films. He signed a contract with MGM as "Stanley Morner".

Unbilled, he lip synced as Allan Jones sang the Irving Berlin song, A Pretty Girl is Like a Melody, in The Great Ziegfeld (1936).

He was billed as "Stanley Morner" in Suzy (1936) and could be seen in Piccadilly Jim (1936), and Old Hutch (1936).

He was given a decent role in Mama Steps Out (1937) and Song of the City (1937) but went back to small parts in Navy Blue and Gold (1937).

Richard Stanley at Paramount
He signed with Paramount who billed him as "Richard Stanley". He was in Men with Wings (1938), King of Alcatraz (1938), Illegal Traffic (1938), and Persons in Hiding (1939).

Warner Bros.

He went over to Warner Bros. who billed him as "Dennis Morgan". According to Shipman the studio "put him on the assembly-line with Wayne Morris, Arthur Kennedy, Jeffrey Lynn, Eddie Albert and Ronald Reagan – likeable young lugs squiring the heroine till Bogart, Cagney or Flynn came crashing down to sweep her up."

He was given the lead in a B picture, Waterfront (1939), followed by No Place to Go (1939) and The Return of Doctor X (1939) with Humphrey Bogart.

Morgan was promoted to "A" films with The Fighting 69th (1940), supporting James Cagney and Pat O'Brien. He supported Priscilla Lane in Three Cheers for the Irish (1940) and went back to "B"s for Tear Gas Squad (1940), Flight Angels (1940), and River's End (1940).

Morgan's career received a boost when RKO borrowed him to play Ginger Rogers' love interest in Kitty Foyle (1940), a big hit.

Warners put him in some comedies, Affectionately Yours (1941) and Kisses for Breakfast (1941), then a Western, Bad Men of Missouri (1941). He supported Cagney again in Captains of the Clouds (1942) and Bette Davis and Olivia de Havilland in In This Our Life (1942).

Morgan co-starred with Ann Sheridan in Wings for the Eagle (1942) and Ida Lupino in The Hard Way (1943). He had the lead in some big Warners musicals: Thank Your Lucky Stars (1943), full of cameos from Warner stars; The Desert Song (1943); Shine On, Harvest Moon (1944), with Sheridan. The latter also featured Jack Carson in a key role. He and Morgan were in The Hard Way together and would go on to be a notable team.

Morgan was in The Very Thought of You (1944) and cameoed in Hollywood Canteen (1944). He had the lead in God Is My Co-Pilot (1945) and Christmas in Connecticut (1945) with Barbara Stanwyck.

Teamed with Jack Carson
Morgan was teamed with fellow Wisconsinite Jack Carson in One More Tomorrow (1946). Warners liked them as a combination, seeing them as similar to Bing Crosby and Bob Hope at Paramount. In the words of Shipman, the films would feature "Morgan as the easy-going singer who always got the girl and Carson as the loud-mouthed but cowardly braggard-comic who was given the air. No one thought they were Hope and Crosby, least of all themselves."

They were reunited in Two Guys from Milwaukee (1946) and The Time, the Place and the Girl (1946).

Without Carson, Morgan made a Western, Cheyenne (1946), a musical My Wild Irish Rose (1947), and To the Victor (1948). In 1947 he was voted Singer of the Year.

He was back with Carson for Two Guys from Texas (1948) then made One Sunday Afternoon (1948) with Janis Paige. He and Carson were in It's a Great Feeling (1949) with Doris Day. Exhibitors voted him the 21st most popular star in the US for 1948.

Morgan made The Lady Takes a Sailor (1949) then Perfect Strangers (1950) with Rogers and Pretty Baby (1950) with Betsy Drake. He made a Western Raton Pass (1950), and a musical Painting the Clouds with Sunshine (1951). He supported Joan Crawford in This Woman Is Dangerous (1952) then went back to Westerns with Cattle Town (1952). After that his contract with Warners ended.

Morgan later said "my mistake was I stayed at one studio too long. Another mistake: I turned down early television, believing then... that people should pay to see us."

Later career

He appeared in sporadic television guest roles in the 1950s, including the ABC religion anthology series, Crossroads, in the 1955 episode "The Gambler" and as Senator-designate Fairchild in an episode of the dramatic anthology series Stage 7, titled "Press Conference" in 1955.

Morgan made films for Sam Katzman, The Gun That Won the West (1955) and Uranium Boom (1956) and went to RKO for Pearl of the South Pacific (1956). He was cast as Dennis O'Finn in the 1958 episode "Bull in a China Shop" on Alfred Hitchcock Presents.

In 1959, Morgan appeared as a regular, Dennis Chase, in eleven episodes of the crime drama, 21 Beacon Street, with Joanna Barnes and Brian Kelly.

Semi-retirement
By 1956, he had retired from films but still made occasional appearances on television, such as the role of Chad Hamilton in the 1962 episode "Source of Information" of the short-lived NBC newspaper drama series, Saints and Sinners. In 1963, he portrayed Dr. Clay Maitland in "The Old Man and the City" on NBC's The Dick Powell Theater. He would perform with the Milwaukee Symphony and on the summer stage circuit.

He returned to films with Rogue's Gallery (1967).

In 1968 he was cast as Dennis Roberts in the episode "Bye, Bye, Doctor" of the CBS sitcom, Petticoat Junction, and he played a cameo as a Hollywood tour guide in the all-star comedy Won Ton Ton, the Dog Who Saved Hollywood in 1976. His final screen performance was on March 1, 1980, as Steve Brian in the episode "Another Time, Another Place/Doctor Who/Gopher's Engagement" of ABC's The Love Boat. Jane Wyman and Audrey Meadows appeared in the same episode.

In 1983, Dennis Morgan, along with his film pal, Jack Carson, who had died in 1963, were inducted into the Wisconsin Performing Artists Hall of Fame.

That year he was critically injured in a car crash.

He was a staunch Republican and a member of the Sierra Vista Presbyterian Church in Oakhurst, California.

Death
Morgan died in 1994 of respiratory failure.

Charity work: Two Strike Park
Morgan dedicated Two Strike Park on July 4, 1959, named for his belief that "a kid forced to play in the streets, with no place to play, already has two strikes against him".

Starting in 1946, Morgan championed the cause of children with nowhere to play. In 1949, as "honorary mayor" of La Crescenta, representing Two Strike Series, Inc., he "offered to donate five acres of land for the park if the County of Los Angeles would purchase two more adjoining acres to complete the initial parcel. In 1950, the Board of Supervisors responded with an additional 3.54 acres of parkland." In 1958 Morgan spearheaded the drive to establish a new public park in La Crescenta in Los Angeles County. He raised funds for the park, at 5107 Rosemont Avenue, by "organizing exhibition baseball games featuring celebrity friends and professional athletes".

Filmography

Features

 I Conquer the Sea! (1936) as Tommy Ashley
The Great Ziegfeld (1936) as Stage Singer in 'Pretty Girl' Number (uncredited)
Suzy (1936) as Lieutenant 
Piccadilly Jim (1936) as Chrystal Club Singer (uncredited)
Old Hutch (1936) as Passerby at Fishing Lake (uncredited)
Mama Steps Out (1937) as Chuck Thompson
Song of the City (1937) as Tommy
Navy Blue and Gold (1937) as Marine 2nd Lt. 
Men with Wings (1938) as Galton
King of Alcatraz (1938) as First Mate Rogers
Illegal Traffic (1938) as Cagey Miller 
Persons in Hiding (1939) as Mike Flagler 
Waterfront (1939) as James 'Jim' Dolen
No Place to Go (1939) as Joe Plummer
The Return of Doctor X (1939) as Michael Rhodes
The Fighting 69th (1940) as Lt. Ames
Three Cheers for the Irish (1940) as Angus Ferguson
Tear Gas Squad (1940) as Tommy McCabe
Flight Angels (1940) as Chick Farber
River's End (1940) as John Keith / Sgt. Derry Conniston
Kitty Foyle (1940) as Wyn Strafford
Affectionately Yours (1941) as Richard 'Rickey' Mayberry
Kisses for Breakfast (1941) as Rodney Trask
Bad Men of Missouri (1941) as Cole Younger
Captains of the Clouds (1942) as Johnny Dutton
In This Our Life (1942) as Peter Kingsmill
Wings for the Eagle (1942) as Corky Jones
The Hard Way (1943) as Paul Collins
Thank Your Lucky Stars (1943) as Tommy Randolph
The Desert Song (1943) as Paul Hudson / El Khobar
Shine On, Harvest Moon (1944) as Jack Norworth
The Very Thought of You (1944) as Sgt. David Stewart
Hollywood Canteen (1944) as himself
God Is My Co-Pilot (1945) as Col. Robert Lee Scott
Christmas in Connecticut (1945) as Jefferson Jones
One More Tomorrow (1946) as Thomas Rufus 'Tom' Collier III
Two Guys from Milwaukee (1946) as Prince Henry
The Time, the Place and the Girl (1946) as Steven Ross
Cheyenne (1947) as James Wylie
Always Together (1947) as The Bridegroom (uncredited)
My Wild Irish Rose (1947) as Chauncey Olcott
To the Victor (1948) as Paul Taggart
Two Guys from Texas (1948) as Steve Carroll
One Sunday Afternoon (1948) as Timothy L. 'Biff' Grimes
It's a Great Feeling (1949) as Dennis Morgan
The Lady Takes a Sailor (1949) as Bill Craig
Perfect Strangers (1950) as David Campbell
Pretty Baby (1950) as Sam Morley
Raton Pass (1951) as Marc Challon
Painting the Clouds with Sunshine (1951) as Vince Nichols
This Woman Is Dangerous (1952) as Dr. Ben Halleck
Cattle Town (1952) as Mike McGann
Pearl of the South Pacific (1955) as Dan Merrill
The Gun That Won the West (1955) as Jim Bridger
Uranium Boom (1956) as Brad Collins
Rogue's Gallery (1968) as Dr. Jonas Pettingill
Busby Berkeley (1974) as himself (documentary)
Won Ton Ton, the Dog Who Saved Hollywood (1976) as Tour Guide

Short subjects
Annie Laurie (1936) as William Douglas
Ride, Cowboy, Ride (1939) as Dinny Logan
The Singing Dude (1940) as Rusty
March On, Marines (1940) as Bob Lansing
Stars on Horseback (1943) as himself (uncredited)
The Shining Future (1944) as himself
Road to Victory (1944) as himself (uncredited)
 I Am an American (1944) as himself (uncredited)
Screen Snapshots: Hollywood Goes to Bat (1950) as himself

Radio

References

External links

 
 
 Jack Carson Tribute
 Stanley Morner '30, Carroll University

1908 births
1994 deaths
20th-century American male actors
20th-century American memoirists
20th-century American singers
20th-century American male singers
American Presbyterians
American male film actors
American people of Swedish descent
California Republicans
Male actors from Fresno, California
Male actors from Los Angeles
Male actors from Wisconsin
Musicians from Fresno, California
People from Prentice, Wisconsin
Singers from California
Warner Bros. contract players
Wisconsin Republicans